Arturo Di Modica (January 26, 1941February 19, 2021) was an Italian sculptor, widely known for his Charging Bull sculpture that he left outside the New York Stock Exchange between pre-dawn police patrols on December 15, 1989.

English sculptor Henry Moore nicknamed Di Modica “the young Michelangelo” after they met in Italy in the 1960s.

Early life
Arturo Di Modica was born in Vittoria, a small town in the province of Ragusa, Sicily, on January 26, 1941. His father, Giuseppe, owned a grocery store and his mother, Angela, was a homemaker. Inspired by his surroundings, in 2017 Di Modica told an interviewer that as a child he had liked to hang out at the craftsmen's workshops and watch them weaving baskets and carving wooden carts. As his father didn't approve of him becoming an artist, Di Modica ran away from home at the age of 18, taking a train to Florence to pursue a career in sculpting.

Upon arrival in Florence, he enrolled in the Accademia di Belle Arti di Firenze and attended courses in the Free School of the Nude for a few years. To support himself, he worked various jobs, including one in the x-ray department of a hospital and one as a mechanic in a local garage. Unable to afford the use of local foundries, he built his own forging and metalworking tools, salvaged materials, and cast bronzes in his home-built foundry.

Career
Di Modica had his first major show of rough abstract bronze castings at Villa Medici in 1968. By the late 1960s, Di Modica had begun working with Carrara marble in Pietrasanta, where he met English sculptor Henry Moore. Moore, who nicknamed Di Modica “the young Michelangelo”, would have a strong influence on Di Modica, who subsequently developed a new style. By 1970, Di Modica had grown frustrated with the limitations of Florence and felt he was not able to express his modernistic ideas. Upon the advice of his teachers, he moved to New York City.

Arrival in New York (1970)

Di Modica set up his first studio on Grand Street in SoHo, a neighborhood popular for its emerging bohemian art scene. Here, he became known for leaving large scale marble works on the street outside his studio. It was also at this address that Di Modica found a young graffiti artist, Jean-Michel Basquiat (also known as SAMO), spray painting his studio door.

Rockefeller Center Installation (1977)
In 1977, Di Modica held a major exhibition at Battery Park and invited art critic Hilton Kramer to the show. Uninterested, Kramer hung up on Di Modica, prompting Di Modica to illegally drop eight monumental abstract marble sculptures outside Rockefeller Center, blocking Fifth Avenue and drawing the attention of police. Surrounded by four police officers with their guns unholstered, Di Modica had yet to master the English language so instead he pushed a gun aside and handed over a flyer by way of explanation. Upon hearing about the commotion and interested to meet the artist, Mayor Abe Beame arrived and, after receiving a $25 fine, Di Modica was granted permission to temporarily leave the sculptures on exhibit. This stunt made the front page of the New York Post the next day and became a valuable learning experience for the artist. All eight sculptures were sold.

54 Crosby Street
Towards the end of the 1970s, Di Modica bought 54 Crosby Street, a vacant lot not far from his first studio. After tearing down the original shack, he built a new building using salvaged materials, completely to his own design and without planning permission. Among the materials he used were seven-meter beams of timber that he attached to himself and dragged back to Crosby Street through the streets at night, as well as 8,000 bricks that he bought for $400 from a priest. He would then go on to add two underground levels, again without the necessary permission, covertly removing the rubble under the cover of darkness. Crosby Street would become his creative center, where he lived, worked and hosted lively art parties and events.

Il Cavallo, Lincoln Center (1988)
During the 1970s, Di Modica's focus was on abstract sculpture, often balancing opposing materials into a single work. However, this began to change in the early 1980s, when his focus turned to the equine form. A 1984 polished bronze horse on display in Trump Tower was followed by Il Cavallo, an almost 10.5 ft depiction of a horse biting its own tail. On Valentine's Day 1988, Di Modica delivered the sculpture – wrapped in a red sheet with the message "Be my Valentine NY Love AD" – to Lincoln Center on the back of his Ferrari. Di Modica later sold a copy of the work to the Italian designer Roberto Cavalli.

Charging Bull (1987–1989)

On October 19, 1987, Black Monday hit U.S. financial markets and the country entered a very difficult period. Di Modica recounted that he felt indebted to the U.S. for welcoming him and enabling his success. Wanting to give something back, he conceived the Charging Bull sculpture. Di Modica spent the next two years creating the 16 ft bronze, reportedly financing the $350,000 cost himself. The sculpture was created in his Crosby Street studio and then cast using a local foundry. Once complete, Di Modica spent the next few nights watching the police patrols on Wall Street trying to find a window of opportunity. Before dawn on December 15, 1989, Di Modica arrived with a group of friends and the sculpture on the back of a truck to find a 40 ft Christmas tree had been installed during the day exactly where he wanted to place the sculpture. With only four minutes between the police patrols, he announced "drop the bull under the tree – it's my gift." The late night event went on to make news all around the world, including the front page of the New York Post.

Di Modica stayed by the sculpture to greet the morning commuters. However, while he was away for lunch, the New York Stock Exchange arranged for the sculpture to be removed. Due to public demand for the bull's return, Parks Commissioner Henry Stern arranged for the sculpture's installation at Bowling Green on December 20, where it can be found to this day.

Di Modica's original concept was to inspire each person who came into contact with the sculpture to carry on fighting with strength and determination through the hard times for the future. While in conversation with art critic and writer Anthony Haden-Guest, Di Modica later explained:

My point was to show people that if you want to do something in a moment things are very bad, you can do it. You can do it by yourself. My point was that you must be strong.

Representation
For the majority of his career, Di Modica chose to work without representation and outside of the formal art market. In 2012, he began working with Jacob Harmer, a British art dealer. In 2020, Harmer published Arturo Di Modica: The Last Modern Master – a book on the life and works of the artist.

Art market

In the mid-2000s British businessman Joe Lewis bought the original Charging Bull statue for an undisclosed sum. A condition of the sale was that the statue stayed at Bowling Green. Lewis also commissioned the remainder of the sculptures within the edition, which had yet to be cast, and they are on display at several of his properties. In 2014, it was reported that Di Modica had been offered $12 million for a 16 ft platinum bull but the deal was never finalized. In October 2018, the first major work by Di Modica went to auction at Phillips London. The 6 ft polished bronze version of Charging Bull was the first in an edition of eight and marked "1987–89". It sold for £309,000 ($405,000). In March 2019, a stainless steel version of Charging Bull went to auction at Sotheby's New York and despite being in poor condition, sold for $275,000. His representative has confirmed that 4 ft sculptures have been sold for up to $496,000 as early as 2013.

Later life and death
In 2004, at the age of 63, Di Modica said: "I have a lot of art to create. I have another 15, 20 years to do something beautiful." Not long after, Di Modica embarked upon two new projects simultaneously: the School of the New Renaissance and Wild Horses. The School of the New Renaissance is a 12-acre sculpture school in his home town of Vittoria. Di Modica believed it would become an international attraction capable of drawing in tourists from all over the world and helping the local economy. Wild Horses was an ambitious project: two 140 ft bronze horses straddling the Ippari River. Shortly before his death and despite his poor health, Di Modica had finished the 40 ft prototype.

Di Modica died on February 19, 2021, in his birthplace of Vittoria, Sicily having had cancer for a number of years. The day of Di Modica's funeral was declared an official day of mourning and crowds of locals gathered outside the church, applauding as his coffin was carried out.

References

1941 births
2021 deaths
People from Vittoria, Sicily
Italian emigrants to the United States
Artists from Sicily
20th-century American sculptors
Italian male sculptors
Italian contemporary artists
20th-century Italian sculptors
20th-century Italian male artists
21st-century Italian sculptors
People with acquired American citizenship
Deaths from cancer in Sicily
21st-century Italian male artists
21st-century American sculptors